Polar Club Glacier is a broad glacier east-northeast of Stranger Point, King George Island, in Antaratica. South of it is Bransfield Strait. Named by the Polish Antarctic Expedition, 1980, after the Polish Polar Club.

See also
 List of glaciers in the Antarctic
 Glaciology

References

Glaciers of King George Island (South Shetland Islands)